Madcap is a prototype system for using computers to automatically segment and highlight a video stream that was designed by Dan Russell's group at PARC. The digital video of weekly forums was stored on a media server, any events such as clapping were marked and time-stamped. Member notes from attendees with laptops were stored. The audio stream was transcribed. All these were used as annotations and were cross indexed.

The development of this system is mentioned in John Seely Brown's work Growing up Digital and his book The Social Life of Information.

External links
 https://web.archive.org/web/20070305070159/http://www.usdla.org/html/journal/FEB02_Issue/article01.html
 http://www.rice.edu/projects/code/broadband.html
 http://www.cs.berkeley.edu/~jfc/hcc/F00/abstracts/russell.html

References

Film and video technology